The 2005 EU Cup of Australian rules football was held in London (England) on October 9, 2005, with 10 national teams. The tournament was won by Belgium who were crowned European Champions after defeating Sweden in the final.

Teams

Pools

Finals

6-8 Places 

Semifinals 

3rd -  4th places 

FINAL

Final standings

 NOTE: Israel and England didn't play the final match, sharing the fifth place.

See also
EU Cup

External links
EU Cup 2005
EU Cup 2005 Results

EU Cup
International sports competitions in London
EU Cup
EU Cup Australian rules football
EU Cup Australian rules football
EU Cup Australian rules football
EU Cup Australian rules football